Johann Adam Remele (died 1740) was a German court painter who was active in Würzburg.

Gallery

References

Year of birth unknown
1740 deaths
18th-century German painters
18th-century German male artists
German male painters
Court painters